Giulio Cesare Zoglio or Julius Caesar Zollio (24 August 1733, Rimini - 13 April 1795) was a Roman Catholic clergyman. In 1785 he became titular bishop of Athenae and the first apostolic nuncio to Munich

References

Sources
http://www.historisches-lexikon-bayerns.de/artikel/artikel_44502

People from Rimini
1795 deaths
1733 births
18th-century Italian Roman Catholic bishops
Apostolic Nuncios to Bavaria